Manyinga District is a district of North-Western Province, Zambia. It was separated from Kabompo District in 2012.

References 

Districts of North-Western Province, Zambia